K-284 Akula was the lead ship in the Soviet submarine class Project 971 Щука-Б (Shchuka-B, 'Shchuka' meaning pike, NATO reporting name "Akula").

The ship was laid down on 6 November 1983 and was commissioned in the Pacific Fleet on 30 December 1984. The submarine was 12-15 dB quieter than the previous generation of Soviet submarines. K-284 served in the Soviet fleet until the collapse of the Soviet Union in 1991 and then continued to serve in the Russian Navy. The submarine was decommissioned in 2001.

References

Akula-class submarines
Ships built in the Soviet Union
1984 ships